Wilfred Thorpe (January 8, 1917 – July 16, 1998) was an American football guard and linebacker. He played for the Cleveland Rams from 1941 to 1942.

References

1917 births
1998 deaths
American football guards
American football linebackers
Arkansas Razorbacks football players
Cleveland Rams players